Delta Dreamflight, renamed Dreamflight and then Take Flight during its final two years of operation, was an attraction located in Tomorrowland at the Magic Kingdom inside the Walt Disney World Resort, and was sponsored by Delta Air Lines. Dreamflight replaced an attraction called If You Could Fly (originally If You Had Wings), sponsored by Eastern Air Lines.

Overview
Dreamflight used the same basic Omnimover ride system that other Disney rides utilize today. It was a dark ride that showcased the history of flight using simplistic sets, some Audio-Animatronics and projection effects. Riders passed through scenes of barnstormers, an M-130, Tokyo and Paris in the 1930s, the jet age, and the future of air travel, and appeared to enter a working jet engine.

Scrapped Disneyland plan
After Delta Dreamflight at Magic Kingdom closed in 1998 to be replaced by Buzz Lightyear Space Ranger Spin which opened in November of that same year. Disney was making the plan of replacing the Circle-Vision 360° theater which was showing American Journeys at the time and Disney hoping for their new ride to be an Omnimover dark ride like the Haunted Mansion in New Orleans Square and due to Delta Dreamflight just meeting the space requirements for it. But the plan was scrapped due to multiple reasons such as not being to able to make a plan with Delta and changes with the Tomorrowland 2055 plan. This was mainly due to a new ride that Walt Disney Imagineering was making for the new Tomorrowland overhaul known as Tomorrowland 2055, which would involve using the Circle-Vision 360° Theater and the old PeopleMover track for a new thrill ride known as Rocket Rods.

Ride description
Guests entered the building into a small queue designed to look like an airport boarding terminal. The front-end nose and cockpit of an actual Delta 767 was situated on the left entering the queue, "passengers" appearing as though they were actually boarding a jetliner. The Delta jet was marked as "The Spirit of Delta" in bright gold. As guests made their way into the queue opposite the jet, they entered a terminal gate with posters on the wall that included many exciting and exotic destinations of the world. Eventually, the guests would make their way back up the terminal gate and enter the side of the jet into a mirrored hallway lined with bright blue, green, red, and yellow neon lights. As guests walked up a ramp they entered the boarding area which was set up in a very similar fashion to the Haunted Mansion. As the bright blue "cars" rode past one would walk onto a moving escalator ramp and "board the flight".

Guests first encountered a giant mural depicting the golden era of aviation in America, adorning the wall in the first room. The second room that guests entered on the attraction had a giant pop-up book style spinning room which had a hot air balloon and other flying contraptions spinning by them as the "Dreamflight" song played. Then guests entered the second room of the "flight" which was designed to look as though they were in a giant crop field of the American mid-west in the roaring 1920s. Biplanes, stunt planes, and barnstormers flew all over the ceiling above a flying circus air show. One plane's pilot had crashed through a barn and got stuck in the rafters on the barn's ceiling. The third room was just a big screen with a film clip of an aerial stuntman standing on top of a prop plane while it performed dizzying stunts as it flew.

Next came the era of air travel, where commercial flights started taking passengers all over the world. Passing by a sign with a rotating globe that advertised air travel, guests would hear an announcer notifying them that their Dreamflight was about to embark for the era of air travel and that their flight would span the world, stopping briefly in Tokyo, Japan, and Paris, France. Guests would then emerge onto a dock in the San Francisco Bay and into the fuselage of Boeing 314 Flying Boat. Inside, they could briefly see the elegant first-class dining room. Guests would next find themselves in Tokyo, where a gentleman in a suit stood on the guests' left in a Japanese garden where locals greeted him. On the right side below the guests were the rooftops of Paris's skyline. Guests "flew" past the rooftops of a Paris street and could see quaint little shops and tourists sitting below on a cafe patio. As the guests moved ahead, they would encounter a rotating glow-in-the-dark sign reading, "Jet Age". Accompanying this, an alternating male or female voice announced, "Ladies and gentlemen, your Dreamflight will depart immediately for the future. Please prepare for supersonic takeoff". To the immediate left on the wall was a giant painting of a jetliner taking off.

As the ride turned the corner, a tunnel with a giant spinning light accompanied by fog and fans gave riders the impression that they were about to actually enter the inside of a turbo jet engine and quite literally enter the Jet Age. The sounds of an engine roaring to life and taking off then gradually intensified over the sound system. Just when the riders think they're about to hit the engine core, the spinning light, fog, and fans quickly zoomed out of view to reveal a projection room, where riders watched footage of a plane taking off to simulate their flight's departure, then lifting off and climbing skyward. The next room contained another film clip on the right which showed computer-generated clips of the riders above earth, flying through a canyon over water, then through a futuristic city with fireworks exploding all around them; the first theatrical-format 70mm computer animations ever produced. The attraction's final room contained another giant pop-up book with destinations spread out on huge pages, while a smaller projection of a Delta jet flew by above the display into the clouds. As guests rode past, the book's pages turned to reveal different destinations.

The exit area was a room with the Delta logo painted on the right wall and with more posters of destinations from around the world to visit.

Tomorrowland Transit Authority PeopleMover dioramas

If You Had Wings had diorama windows that allowed riders on the Tomorrowland Transit Authority PeopleMover to look down into the ride. When If You Had Wings was replaced with Delta Dreamflight, the dioramas on the Tomorrowland Transit Authority PeopleMover changed. One diorama window was removed in the process:

The first window was replaced with backlit panels depicting the ride's barnstormer scene.
The second window looked into the Parisian Excursion scene, from a viewpoint which heavily distorted the tableau's forced perspective.
The third window would have had riders looking directly into an extremely bright light and so was completely obscured with plywood and black fabric.

Sponsorship ends
Delta sponsored the ride from its opening in 1989 through the end of 1995. The decision not to continue sponsorship was made in part due to the costs of sponsoring the 1996 Olympics in Atlanta, Georgia. From January 1, 1996 to June 4, 1996 the attraction was renamed simply "Dreamflight" while its future was being determined.  On June 5, 1996 it reopened as  Take Flight. It was only a slight refurbishment; all references to Delta were removed and the attraction's popular theme songs were rerecorded.  Take Flight closed its doors for good on January 5, 1998, ending the dynasty of flight-based attractions to occupy the space.  It was replaced by the interactive dark ride Buzz Lightyear's Space Ranger Spin, which was inspired by Disney/Pixar's Toy Story films.

Attraction facts

Delta Dreamflight
 Opened: June 23, 1989
 Sponsor: Delta Air Lines (sponsorship ended on January 1, 1996)
Special note: After the attraction lost sponsorship it was simply known as Dreamflight between January 1, 1996 and June 4, 1996).

Take Flight
 Opened: June 5, 1996
 Closed: January 5, 1998

See also
 Magic Kingdom attraction and entertainment history

References

External links
 https://www.youtube.com/watch?v=tx0hC-s_iQo Video clip of the ride.

Amusement rides introduced in 1989
Amusement rides that closed in 1996
Amusement rides manufactured by Arrow Dynamics
Former Walt Disney Parks and Resorts attractions
Tomorrowland
Audio-Animatronic attractions
Omnimover attractions
Delta Air Lines
Aviation attractions
Amusement rides using motion pictures
1989 establishments in Florida
1998 disestablishments in Florida